Haustellum haustellum is a species of sea snail, a marine gastropod mollusk in the family Muricidae, the murex snails or rock snails. It is the type species of the genus Haustellum Schumacher, 1817.

Description

Distribution
Haustellum haustellum is known from Taiwan, Indonesia, Vietnam, the Solomon Islands, northern Queensland in Australia, New Caledonia, Fiji, Madagascar, the Mascarene basin and the Red Sea

Paleontology
Haustellum haustellum is recorded from the Miocene of Borneo, the Pliocene of Java, Indonesia and the Plio-Pleistocene of the Malaysian Archipelago.

References

Muricidae
Gastropods described in 1758
Taxa named by Carl Linnaeus